Allancastria cerisyi, the eastern festoon, is an Old World papilionid butterfly whose geographical range extends from the Balkans to include Turkey and the near Middle East. It exhibits several geographical variants.

It is named for Alexandre Louis Lefèbvre de Cérisy.

The butterfly flies from March to July depending on the location.

The larvae feed on various Aristolochia species.

Synonymy/subspecies

Allancastria cerisyi (Godart, 1824)

Thais cerisyi Godart, 1824; Ency. Methodique 9: 812
Thais cerisy Godart, 1822; Mém. Soc. linn. Paris 2: 234, pl. 20, f. 3-4
  
Allancastria cerisyi cerisyi
Thais cerisyi martini Fruhstorfer, 1906 Soc. Ent. 21 (19): 147, Type locality Rhodos
martini Abadjiev, 2002, Neue Ent. Nachr. 23: 8
A. c. dalmacijae Sala & Bollino, 1994 Dalmatia (Makarska) Type Locality Makarska, Dalmatia, Croatia
A. c. huberi Sala & Bollino, 1994 N.Greece Type locality Greece, Florina
A. c. ferdinandi Stichel, 1907 Albania Bulgaria Type locality Bulgaria
A. c. mihljevici Sijaric, 1990 Hercegowina  Type locality  Hercegovina

References

 Sala, G., Bollino, M., 1994. Allancastria cerisyi Godart, 1822 in the Balkans: new subspecies and critical notes on the existing populations (Lepidoptera: Papilionidae). Atalanta (Würzburg) 25: 151-160, Plates II, III.

Literature
 Abadjiev, 2002 Types of Balkan butterflies in the collection of The Natural History Museum, London Neue Ent. Nachr. 23: 3-53 
 Fruhstorfer, 1906 Eine neue Thais von Rhodos Soc. Ent. 21 (19): 147-148  
 Sala & Bollino, 1994 Allancastria cerisyi Godart, 1922 in the Balkans: News subspecies and critical notes on the existing populations Atalanta 25 (1/2): 151-160 
 Sijaric, 1990 Taxonomska istrazivania i nove podvrste vrsta roda Zerynthia ne nekim podrucijima Jugoslavije Glasn. zemelj. Mus. Bosni Herceg. (n.s.) 28 (1989): 177-208 
 Stichel, 1907 Neue Unterarten von Zerynthia cerisyi God. Ent. Z. 21: 177-178

External links
 TOL

Papilionidae
Butterflies of Europe
Butterflies described in 1824
Taxa named by Jean-Baptiste Godart